Dabholkar is a surname. Notable people with the surname include:

Atish Dabholkar (born 1963), Indian physicist
Devdatta Dabholkar (1919–2010), Indian educationist and socialist
Narendra Dabholkar (1945–2013), Indian rationalist and writer
Shripad Dabholkar (1924–2001), Indian activist
Vishal Dabholkar (born 1987), Indian cricketer
Vrishasen Dabholkar, Indian actor